Datatel, Inc. was a private company that provided fully integrated software and professional services to build enterprise education platforms for higher education until it combined with its competitor SunGard Higher Education to form Ellucian in 2012. Datatel was headquartered in Fairfax, Virginia.

With 533 employees, Datatel had more than 799 client institutions located in the United States, Canada, Guam, Puerto Rico, American Samoa, and Bermuda.

History
Datatel was founded by Tom Davidson in 1968 as a data processing service bureau. The company began in the mezzanine of a suburban office supply store outside of Washington, D.C. A few years later, Datatel began performing data processing for banks. In 1973, the company grew substantially when Davidson merged Datatel with Data Technology Corporation, owned by Ken Kendrick. Datatel focused on higher education since 1979.

Beginning in 1992, the company was led by Russ Griffith, who died on August 7, 2006. Under Griffith's leadership in 2005, Datatel’s executive team—backed by Thoma Cressey Equity Partners, and Trident Capital—signed an agreement to acquire the company from Davidson and Kendrick. Davidson went on to co-found the Balance Bar food company in 1992, and Kendrick became a managing partner of the Arizona Diamondbacks baseball team. In 2004, Datatel acquired the LiquidMatrix Corporation, a Buffalo-based provider of student recruiting and alumni outreach Web-based software.

Datatel was acquired in December 2009 by private equity company Hellman & Friedman.

In March 2012, Datatel merged with SunGard Higher Education to form Ellucian.

Timeline
1972: Released the Silent 700, a programmable data terminal
1975: Became the first East Coast Microdata dealer
1976: Began development of TOPS, the Total Office Product System, later to be known as ASSETS
1979: Became first PRIME information dealer and began selling solutions for colleges and universities
Willamette University became first Datatel client 
Development of Colleague began
1986: Opened San Francisco office
1987: Moved to current headquarters in the Fair Lakes area of Fairfax, Virginia
1988: Sold hundredth Colleague client
1989: Changed to multiplatform UNIX
1990: Established Datatel Scholar's Foundation 
1991 Announced products on IBM and Sequent platforms
 Acquired first Canadian client, the University of Waterloo
1996: Introduced Client/Server
2002: Formed Datatel Center for Institutional Effectiveness (DCIE)
2004: Acquired LiquidMatrix Corporation
2005: Management buyout of founders
2006: Longtime president and CEO Russ Griffith died
2007: Reached 39th year of consecutive growth 
 Released ActiveCampus Portal, built on Microsoft SharePoint 
2009: Acquired in December 2009 by private equity company Hellman & Friedman.
2010: Announced 2009 revenues of $138 million
2012: Merged with SunGard Higher Education to form Ellucian

Awards
Recipient of the U.S. Senate Productivity and Quality Award (SPQA) for Virginia in 1997
Selected as one of the Washingtonian magazine’s Great Places to Work in 2001, 2003, 2005, and 2007
Recipient of the 2003 CARE Award for mid-sized companies as presented by the Northern Virginia Family Services organization
 Recipient of the 2003 National Capital Business Ethics Award from The National Capital Chapter of the Society of Financial Service Professional 
Recipient of the University of Maryland’s Smith Digital Economy Award in 2008
Top finalist for Microsoft Partner of the Year Award in Information Worker Solutions, Portals, and Collaboration in 2008
Named Microsoft Public Sector Education Partner of the Year 2009, developing an enterprise CRM solution, expanding into the Teaching and Learning market segment, and introducing a mobile application for administrative and academic information on the go

Products
Datatel Colleague, an administrative software suite based on a single-source technology approach, coupled with data-driven, rules-based architecture. The five components of Colleague are:
CORE
ST (Student)	
CF (Colleague Finance)
CA (Colleague Advancement)
HR (Human Resources)
Datatel Mobile Access (MOX), powered by DubLabs
Datatel Portal
Datatel Recruiter
Datatel WCMS
Datatel Intelligent Learning Platform (ILP)

Professional services
Administrative and application management
Consulting
Datatel Center for Institutional Effectiveness (DCIE) - provides strategic planning programs for administrators in higher education
Institutional effectiveness
Professional executive services
Strategic planning and project management
Support and self-service
Training and education
Web site design

Related information
Datatel Users' Group (DUG) is a professional association of members from Datatel's client institutions. DUG holds annual and regional conferences.

In 1990, Datatel formed the Datatel Scholars Foundation to award scholarships to outstanding undergraduate and graduate students attending Datatel client institutions. The Foundation has awarded over 3,700 scholarships totaling more than $5.5 million.

Notes

Additional References
Company website
"Datatel Offers Web-Enabled Management Software," Campus Technology, August 12, 2002
"Company Profile for Datatel, Inc." Reuters, 2008 
"Great Places to Work: The List," Washingtonian magazine, 2005
"Microsoft Announces 2008 Partner of the Year Awards Finalists and Winners," 2008
"Great Places to Work: Where to Feel at Home," Washingtonian magazine, 2007

Software companies based in Virginia
Defunct software companies of the United States
1968 establishments in Virginia